Adam Khan Kili is a town in the Federally Administered Tribal Areas of Pakistan. It is located at 32°19'55N 70°7'30E with an altitude of 677 metres (2224 feet).

References

Populated places in Khyber Pakhtunkhwa